Barazek or barazeq (in Arabic برازق barāzeq) is a Syrian-Palestinian cookie whose main ingredient is sesame (سمسم sumsum) and often also contain pieces of pistachio. It probably originated during Ottoman rule in the Syrian capital, Damascus, particularly in the Al-Midan neighborhood, although today it is so popular that it can be found in most pastry shops throughout the Levantine area (Lebanon, Jordan, Palestine and Syria) and beyond. It is also one of the more traditional Palestinian desserts and it is easy to find stalls selling barazek on the streets of Jerusalem.

It is considered one of the most famous Syrian desserts and has a multitude of variants. All include flour, butter, sugar, and sesame; some may also include egg, milk, pistachios, honey, mahleb, yeast, and vanilla, as well as clarified butter (samneh) instead of regular butter. It has a sweet, buttery and nutty flavor, and a crisp and brittle texture.

Preparation 
The following recipe does not include milk but does include egg yolk. With your hands, mix 250 g of flour with 150 g of butter (cold) sliced into pieces. It is crumbled until it is a sandy texture and then the icing sugar, the yolks of two eggs and the vanilla extract are added. The dough is compacted, wrapped in film and left to rest in the fridge. This dough is very similar to French shortbread.

After a few hours, the dough is removed from the refrigerator and pellets of approximately fifteen grams are made. The pellets are crushed on a plate with sesame and placed on the oven tray, which must be preheated to 200º C. The tray is placed in the oven and when it begins to smell, or when the edges are toasted (after 10 minutes ), it is removed and transferred to a tray with a wire rack to cool and harden.

References 

Arab desserts
Biscuits
Lebanese cuisine
Levantine cuisine
Palestinian cuisine
Syrian cuisine